In enzymology, a 4-alpha-glucanotransferase is an enzyme that catalyzes a chemical reaction that transfers a segment of a 1,4-alpha-D-glucan to a new position in an acceptor carbohydrate, which may be glucose or a 1,4-alpha-D-glucan.

This enzyme belongs to the family of glycosyltransferases, specifically the hexosyltransferases.  The systematic name of this enzyme class is 1,4-alpha-D-glucan:1,4-alpha-D-glucan 4-alpha-D-glycosyltransferase. Other names in common use include disproportionating enzyme, dextrin glycosyltransferase, D-enzyme, debranching enzyme maltodextrin glycosyltransferase, amylomaltase, and dextrin transglycosylase.  This enzyme participates in starch and sucrose metabolism in plants. Studies of the enzyme from potato led to the discovery of cycloamylose.

Structural studies

References

 
 
 
 
 

EC 2.4.1
Enzymes of known structure